Devmanus (-God Figure) is an Indian Marathi language crime thriller television series. The show premiered from 31 August 2020 on Zee Marathi by replacing Ratris Khel Chale 2. It starred Kiran Gaikwad and Asmita Deshmukh in lead roles. It was produced by Shweta Shinde and directed by Raju Sawant under the banner of Vajra Productions. It is supposedly inspired by true story. Santosh Pol was described as a doctor death a notorious doctor who killed 6 people in 13 years of his practice in the town of Satara.

Plot 
A police inspector makes a criminal confess his crimes, then the story goes in past. A constable chides a man for giving false hopes of a role in films in Mumbai to Dimple. Meanwhile, When a doctor catches a compounder (who later becomes a quack doctor) stealing money from his patients, he injures the doctor and runs away. Later, Dimple returns to her village, her mother beats her with a broom. Then, Dr. Ajitkumar Dev (compounder-turned-fake doctor) arrives at their Wada. Mangal (Dimple's mother) tells Dr. Ajitkumar Dev that Babu (Dimple's father) has not opened his eyes. Babu feels overwhelmed and tells his story to Ajitkumar. Mangal tells Babu to call Ajitkumar to stay in their house.

After that, Ajitkumar gets scared when he sees Rupali (Ajitkumar's friend) in the clinic. Reshma, a savkar's wife pours heart out to Ajitkumar. Furious on learning the truth about Ajitkumar, Rupali confronts him. When he refuses to marry her, she threatens him. After that, in aggression Ajitkumar kills Rupali and buries her under a concrete bench near his clinic. Ajitkumar sweet talks Reshma into eloping with him taking Vijay's (Reshma's husband) money and jewellery. Reshma refuses to get Ajitkumar out of Vijay's house. As Vijay comes after her, she strikes him on the head with a flowerpot. After that, he also kills Reshma because he deceives her for money and he doesn't love her. Mangal matches the marriage of Dimple with Mahesh, but Dimple refuses to married. She blackmails Ajitkumar and asks him to break her marriage alliance because Dimple collects deadbody of Reshma from Ajitkumar's room and keep it in secret. So, Ajitkumar gets ready to break her marriage. A confusion creates Ajitkumar leading to a fight and Dimple's marriage gets called off. Later, Ajitkumar asks Dimple about Reshma's dead body. Dimple talks about her goals and ambitions with Ajitkumar and tells him that she helps him in every crime. After that, Ajitkumar also killed Aparna and her mother for money.

Later, everyone is happy as Manjula comes to the village. Mangal introduces Manjula to Ajitkumar. Manjula gives a fitting reply to Ajitkumar, who tries to get close to her. Manjula apologises to Ajitkumar and tells him the reason behind her actions. Manjula asks Namya to get medication from Mumbai on the promise that he won't tell to anyone. Manjula tells Aaji the truth about her husband. The villagers gossip bad about Manjula. Villagers asks Ajitkumar to talk sense into Manjula and tell him to oust her from the village if she fails to budge. The villagers protest at Manjula's house asking her to leave the village. Manjula introduces her husband who is in a wheelchair, shocking everyone. Manjula and her husband roam around the village and meet with Aaji at the Wada. The villagers apologise to Manjula. Later, Manjula and Ajitkumar bury their hatchet and start afresh. Ajitkumar meets with Suresh to convince him to not buy Manjula's land. Manjula, Amar and Sanju wait for Suresh at the office, but Ajitkumar kills Suresh. 

Dimple notices the blood on Ajitkumar shoe and confronts him about it. After that altercation happen between Ajitkumar and Sanju. So, Ajitkumar kills Sanju also and buried him behind the Wada. At that time, Aaji came at that location, but she doesn't know who buried the Sanju. Next day, Aaji calls police and they came at that  location. Police got dead body of dog because dimple replaced body with Sanju's body. Afterwards, Dimple, Ajitkumar and Manjula went to Mahabaleshwar. Ajitkumar won to take space in Manjula's mind in those days. A few days later the doctor proposed to Manjula and forced her and Manjula found out the true nature of the doctor. The doctor started harassing Manjula but Manjula did not tell anyone about it. A few days later, the doctor comes to Manjula's house and gets the land deed signed by Manjula's husband and goes there kitchen and turns on the gas regulator in her house. After a while she comes into the house and goes into the kitchen and turns on the gas and there is a very big explosion and she burns and died.

A few days later, a lady inspector Divya Singh comes to the village with her daughter Myra to solve Manjula's case. Seeing the Divya makes the doctor's mind light up and the doctor falls in love with her. Mangal decides Dimple's marriage with Ajitkumar. Ajitkumar refuses about it, but Dimple gets ready to marry with him. A few days later, Rupali's father comes to the village in search of Rupali. When the doctor finds out that Rupali's father has come to the village, the doctor plots to kill him. One day the doctor calls him to his clinic and puts a flower pot on his head while talking to him but he is not died. The doctor tries to get close to the Divya but is unsuccessful, so he makes a plan to reach her through Myra (Divya's daughter). He traps Myra in his trap and convinces Myra that he is her second dad and Myra agrees and tells the Divya that this is my dad from today. A few days later, the Doctor kills Rupali's father by drinking alcohol. After that, police get confirm news that Dr. Ajitkumar is Devisingh. So, they try to collect information about him from Dimple. 

When Doctor knows about it, he plans to go Mumbai to save from Police. But, when he goes to bus stand, he got news that Police collected all about his past information and they came to village to catch some clues about the doctor. Police get  information about Doctor's truth through Dimple. So, Doctor goes to Police officer's house with the help of Dimple and kills him using injection and gun. Also, Dimple knows about Ajitkumar's truth that he is not a doctor, he is a compounder. Slowly, Doctor pulls Divya into the trap of love and Divya falls in love with the doctor. The doctor's plan finally succeeds. A few days later, Mangal and Babu decide to marry Dimple and the doctor, but the doctor does not approve because Divya loves the doctor. Eventually, the doctor gets ready to marry Dimple then Divya also approve this relation and starts her case she takes the fingerprints of some people including the doctor and the doctor's fingerprints match and Divya finds some evidence which makes her realise that the doctor is Devisingh.

Ajitkumar and Dimple getting married and that time Divya leads the Ajitkumar from the wedding tent and he is arrested but the villagers stand firmly by the Ajitkumar, but Divya still does not leave him. Eventually, the case goes to court and Advocate Aarya Deshmukh is appointed to fight against Ajitkumar. Aarya presents evidence in court against the Devi Singh and after looking at all the evidence, Judge given an opportunity to Ajitkumar to cross-examine. At the same time, when Dimple comes to meet Ajit Kumar in jail, Devisingh tells his secret story to Dimple that Dr. Ajit Kumar Dev is his twin brother and he too was killed by him. After due to lack of evidence Ajit Kumar was released from jail.

Cast

Main 
 Kiran Gaikwad as Dr. Ajitkumar Chandrakant Dev / Devisingh (2020–2021)
 Asmita Deshmukh as Sagarika Babu Patil (Dimple) (2020–2021)

Recurring 
Dimple's family
 Anjali Joglekar as Mangal Babu Patil (2020–2021)
 Ankush Mandekar as Babu Rangrao Patil (2020–2021)
 Viral Mane as Shubhankar Babu Patil (Tonya) (2020–2021)
 Rukmini Sutar as Saru Patil (Aaji) (2020–2021)
 Pushpa Choudhari as Vandi (2020–2021)
 Shashi Doiphode as Lala (2020-2021)

Others
 Neha Khan as ACP Divya Singh (2021)
 Sonali Patil as Advocate Aarya Deshmukh (2021)
 Ajinkya Date as Inspector Amit Shinde (2021)
 Satyawan Shikhare as Inspector Viraj Shikhare (2021)
 Arjun Kusumbe as ACP Ranjit Chavan (2020-2021)
 Rajratna Waghmare as Judge (2021)

Villagers
 Sanjana Kale as Rinku (2021)
 Madhuri Pawar as Chanda (2021)
 Pratiksha Jadhav as Manjula Amar Sankpal (2020-2021)
 Mimicharvi Khadse as Myra Singh (2021)
 Vardhan Deshpande as Amar Sankpal (2020-2021)
 Kiran Dange as Bajarang Patil (2020–2021)
 Kabir Gaikwad as Krish (2020)
 Nilesh Gaware as Namdev Jadhav (2020–2021)
 Vansh Shah as Vitthal (2020-2021)
 Sagar Korade as Sanjay (2020-2021)
 Eknath Gite as Vijay Shinde (2020-2021)
 Gayatri Bansode as Reshma Vijay Shinde (2020)
 Tejal Shinde as Dimple's friend (2020)
 Ravina Gogawale as Ravina Bajrang Patil (2020-2021)
 Rutuja Pawar as Rani (2020)
 Deepali Jadhav as Rupali (2020)
 Aishwarya Nagesh as Aparna (2020)
 Sachin Hagvane-Patil as Suresh Patil (2020)
 Kulbhushan Palkar as Mahesh (2020)

Production

Filming 
In April 2021, curfew was announced in Maharashtra due to increased COVID cases, while the production halted in Satara. Hence, the production location was shifted temporarily to Nipani, Karnataka.

Casting 
Kiran Gaikwad was selected to play Dr. Ajitkumar Dev. Asmita Deshmukh was selected to play Dimple. Pratiksha Jadhav was selected to play Manjula. Neha Khan was selected for the role of ACP Divya Singh. Sonali Patil was cast for the role of Advocate Arya Deshmukh.

Special episode

1 hour 
 17 January 2021

2 hours 
 21 March 2021 (Ajitkumar's truth reveal)
 30 May 2021 (Ajitkumar's murder mystery)
 15 August 2021 (Last episode)

Sequel 
The channel and production house rolled out another sequel with 4 months of its closure. The show premiered from 19 December 2021. Kiran Gaikwad is being retained for the titular role of Dr. Ajitkumar Dev (Devmanus). Few new characters were a part of this sequel. It replaced the horror show Ti Parat Aaliye. The story of the show will be a continuation of its first season.

Reception

Ratings

Dubbed version

Awards

References

External links 
 
Devmanus at ZEE5

Marathi-language television shows
Indian crime television series
Zee Marathi original programming
2020 Indian television series debuts
2021 Indian television series endings